Tain in Ross-shire was a burgh constituency that elected one commissioner to the Parliament of Scotland and to the Convention of Estates.

After the Acts of Union 1707, Tain, Dingwall, Dornoch, Kirkwall and Wick formed the Tain district of burghs, returning one member between them to the House of Commons of Great Britain.

List of burgh commissioners

 1661–63: Andrew Roe  
 1665 convention, 1669–70: Walter Ross, bailie 
 1672–74: Alexander Forrester of Edertaine, provost  
 1667 convention, 1678 convention, 1681–82, 1685–86: John Forrester, former bailie 
 1689 convention, 1689–1702: William Ross the younger of Easterfern  
 1702–07: Captain Daniel MacLeod

See also
 List of constituencies in the Parliament of Scotland at the time of the Union

References

Politics of the county of Ross
History of the Scottish Highlands
Constituencies of the Parliament of Scotland (to 1707)
Constituencies disestablished in 1707
1707 disestablishments in Scotland
Tain